The Medveditsa is a river in Volgograd and Saratov Oblasts in Russia, a left tributary of the Don. The name means she-bear, and according to legend alludes to the large population of bears in the area in earlier times.

The river has its sources on the Volga Uplands, in the northeastern parts of Saratov Oblast, and flows mainly in a southwestern direction. It joins the Reka Don in Volgograd Oblast near Zatonski. Its largest tributaries are, from the right: Balanda and Tersa, and from the left: Idolga, Karamysh and Archeda.

The towns of Petrovsk, Atkarsk, Medveditsa, Zhirnovsk, and Mikhaylovka are situated on the Medveditsa. The river is navigable to Atkarsk.

A variety of fish is found in the Medveditsa River: catfish, pike, bream, asp, perch, chub, perch, tench, roach, gudgeon and others. In the late 80s there were a lot of sterlet.

Forests along both banks of the river have a wide variety of birds, medicinal herbs, wild berries, fruits and flowers.

References

Rivers of Volgograd Oblast
Rivers of Saratov Oblast